Menesia sulphurata is a species of beetle in the family Cerambycidae. It was described by Gebler in 1825, originally under the genus Saperda. It is known from Mongolia, Kazakhstan, Japan, China, and Russia.

Varietas
 Menesia sulphurata var. gifuensis Breuning, 1954
 Menesia sulphurata var. bipustulata Plavilstshikov, 1927
 Menesia sulphurata var. flavotecta Heyden, 1886
 Menesia sulphurata var. semivittata Pic, 1915
 Menesia sulphurata var. nigrocincta Pic, 1915

References

Menesia
Beetles described in 1825